Gaspare "Kaspar" Capparoni (born 1 August 1964) is an Italian actor.

Biography
A native of Rome, Capparoni became a theater actor when he was 18, directed by Giuseppe Patroni Griffi. In 1984 he also appeared in the film Phenomena, directed by Dario Argento.

He has worked in various fiction television settings, which included: the soap operas Ricominciamo (2000, TV miniseries), Piccolo mondo antico (TV miniseries), Incantesimo 4 (2001), Elisa di Rivombrosa (2003), La caccia (2005, a TV miniseries directed by Massimo Spano, as the antagonist for Alessio Boni), and for Capri (2006, TV series) alongside actress Bianca Guaccero.  
  
In 2007, he performed as a protagonist in the miniseries Donna Detective directed by Cinzia TH Torrini.  In 2008, he was also in Inspector Rex, under the direction of Marco Serafini, and in the series Capri 2 directed by Andrea Barzini and Giorgio Molteni.

Filmography

Cinema 
Phenomena (1984) - Karl, Sophie's Boyfriend
Colpi di luce (1985)
Bellifreschi (1987)
Gialloparma (1999) - Giulio
Encantado (2002) - Thomas Grasso
Il ritorno del Monnezza (2005) - Avv. Lamantia
Il sole nero (2007) - Salvo
Two families (2007)

Television 
Addio e ritorno (1995, TV Movie) - Francesco
Tequila & Bonetti (2000, Episode: "Cuore rapito") - Andrea Naselli
La casa delle beffe (2000, TV Movie)
Ricominciare (2000-2001) - Alex (2000)
Piccolo mondo antico (2001, TV Movie) - Rampelli
Incantesimo 4 (2001) - Dr. Max Rudolph
Elisa di Rivombrosa (2003-2004) - Giulio Drago
La caccia (2005, TV Movie) - Mario Saracco
Provaci ancora Prof (2005, Episode: "La mia compagna di banco") - Edoardo Sovena
Capri (2006-2008) - Massimo Galiano
Donna Detective (2007-2010) - Michele Mattei
Rex (2008-2011) - Lorenzo Fabbri
Il giudice Mastrangelo 3 (2009)

External links 

 

1964 births
Living people
Male actors from Rome
Italian male film actors
Italian male television actors
Dancing with the Stars winners
Reality show winners